Greg Smith (born c. 1970) was a walk-on to the Ohio State football team in 1988 after graduating from Glen Oak High School in Canton, Ohio.  Greg earned a scholarship at Ohio State in 1990 and started at nose tackle during the 1991 and 1992 seasons.  He was an Academic All-American in 1992.  Smith earned All-Big Ten honors in 1992. Greg Smith played for the Ohio State Buckeyes between 1988 and 1992.

Today
Dr. Greg Smith is an orthopedic surgeon and currently resides in Laguna Vista, Texas.

References

1970s births
Living people
American football defensive tackles
Ohio State Buckeyes football players
American orthopedic surgeons
Players of American football from Canton, Ohio